Corey Lof is a Canadian actor living in Toronto, Ontario. He is mainly known in the world of web series, to be Kenny, in the award-winning LGBT webseries, Out With Dad.

Filmography

Cinema

Movies 
 2013 - Blood Riders: The Devil Rides with Us : Janek

Short films 
 2009 - The Congress of Vienna : Stewart Castlereagh 
 2010 - Bunked! : Adam Isaacs 
 2010 - 2009: A Delayed Night : Steve 
 2011 - Kaizen : Donald 
 2011 - Neighbourhood Heroes : FBI John
 2011 - Withinsanity : Mason Reid
 2011 - The Ties : Nick
 2011 - Monday  : John
 2012 - Shadow Weaver : Andrew
 2013 - For Now : Riley  (auteur : Corey Lof)
 2014 - After the Break : Adam

Cable 

 2014 - Bitten (S1E02) : High Teen #2

Internet 

 2010/... - Out With Dad : Kenny

Recognition 
Lof has received the following nominations and awards:

LA Web Series Festival 2012 award: Outstanding Ensemble Cast in a Drama for Out with Dad " :
Academy of WebTelevision Awards nomination: Best Ensemble Performance for Out with Dad 
4th Indie Soap Awards (2013) nomination: Best Supporting Actor, Drama for Out with Dad
 Academy of WebTelevision Awards 2015 award: Best Ensemble Performance for Out with Dad

References

External links 
 
 Out with Dad Cast

Living people
Canadian male film actors
Canadian male web series actors
21st-century Canadian male actors
Year of birth missing (living people)